Scopula normalis is a moth of the  family Geometridae. It is found in Madagascar.

References

Moths described in 1956
normalis
Moths of Madagascar